Laurence Wedgwood (1844 – 5 May 1913) was a director of the Wedgwood pottery firm.

Wedgwood was the youngest son of Francis Wedgwood and his wife, Frances Mosley.  Wedgwood helped incorporate Josiah Wedgwood & Sons Ltd. in 1895.  Elder brothers Godfrey and Clement were also in the business.  He was the great-grandson of the potter Josiah Wedgwood. He married Emma Elizabeth Houseman on 18 April 1871 and they had six children:

Kennard Laurence Wedgwood (1873-1949), partner in Wedgwood & sons.
Mary Frances "Molly" Wedgwood (1874-1969)
Gilbert Henry Wedgwood (1876-1963), an officer in the York and Lancaster Regiment
Clement John Wedgwood (1877-1954)
Geoffrey Walter Wedgwood (1879-1897)
Unnamed daughter (born and died 22 October 1882)

References 

1844 births
1913 deaths
British potters
Wedgwood pottery
19th-century British businesspeople